"You Light Up My Life" is a ballad written by Joseph Brooks, and originally recorded by Kasey Cisyk for the soundtrack album to the 1977 film of the same title. The song was lip synced in the film by its lead actress, Didi Conn. The best-known cover version of the song is a cover by Debby Boone, the daughter of singer Pat Boone. It held the No. 1 position on the Billboard Hot 100 chart for ten consecutive weeks in 1977 and topped Record World magazine's Top 100 Singles Chart for a record 13 weeks.

Original film version

Cisyk's original soundtrack recording was included in the film's soundtrack album. Then later it was released as a single to bolster sales of the soundtrack album after Debby Boone included her version on her first solo album (also titled You Light Up My Life). Although the soundtrack album was certified Gold, peaking at No. 17 on the Billboard 200 albums chart, it never included Boone's hit single version of the song.

Cisyk's single was credited to "Original Cast", not to Cisyk herself, and even though Brooks is listed on the A-side of the single, the "Original Cast" B-side charted on the Billboard Hot 100 and only reached No. 80. Brooks also released an instrumental version of the song from the soundtrack as a promotional single, but that version failed to chart.

Following the success of Boone's version, the song earned Brooks a Grammy Award for Song of the Year, an Academy Award for Best Original Song, a Golden Globe Award for Best Original Song and an American Society of Composers, Authors and Publishers (ASCAP) award.

Track listing
7" vinyl single
"You Light Up My Life" (Instrumental) — 3:02
"You Light Up My Life" (Original Cast) — 3:29

Chart performance (Original Cast single)

The Joseph Brooks controversies
In a 2013 biographical essay about Cisyk,  Cisyk's second husband, Ed Rakowicz (who worked as a sound engineer, but not for this song), wrote that songwriter Brooks was initially pleased with Cisyk's recording of the song with orchestra (and her version appeared in the movie and soundtrack) but "tried to evade payment by false promises and by asking her to be an incidental actor in his film, implying huge rewards yet to come..."  Rackowicz claimed that Brooks made improper advances toward Cisyk, that after being rebuffed, he refused to speak directly to her again, and that he continued to evade payments to her while commissioning another recording with Debby Boone.

According to Rackowicz, "Besides wanting Boone to copy Kacey's [sic] iconic hit reading of his songs, Brooks needed to cover up Kacey's vocal leakage in the microphones in the piano recorded at the original demo session on which was overdubbed the orchestral track used in the film. Brooks didn't want to pay to re-record the piano and orchestra again." In 2003, Boone admitted, "I had no freedom whatsoever. Joe told me exactly how to sing it and imitate every inflection from the original recording." in an interview with Entertainment Weekly Magazine. Cisyk later retained a lawyer and sued Brooks for the fees she had earned for her work on the record and for credit on the soundtrack, which she later received.

Debby Boone version

In 1977, Debby Boone, Pat Boone's daughter, recorded the song under the guidance of Curb Records executive Mike Curb and songwriter Joseph Brooks. Boone recorded her vocals over a pre-existing instrumental track that Brooks already had developed for the film's soundtrack. The song was released as both a Warner-Curb Records single and as the title track to her first solo album, You Light Up My Life, which she released on Warner Bros. Records, Curb Records' parent label.

Cash Box said that "Ms. Boone builds it to a powerful emotional peak as a massive string section lends support."

The single became the biggest single of the 1970s in the United States, setting a new Billboard Hot 100 record for most weeks spent at number one. Elvis Presley's double-sided hit "Don't Be Cruel/Hound Dog", then recognized as the longest-running number one song of the rock era, spent eleven weeks atop the Billboard Best Sellers chart in 1956, before the 1958 debut of the Hot 100. The previous Hot 100 record was held by Bobby Darin's "Mack the Knife", Percy Faith's recording of "Theme from A Summer Place" (1960) and the Beatles' "Hey Jude" (1968), all three of which remained at No. 1 for nine weeks.  The ten-week record was matched in 1982 by Olivia Newton-John's "Physical", but was not surpassed until a 1991 change in chart methodology allowed songs to achieve longer reigns at No. 1. In 1992, "End of the Road" by Boyz II Men would set the new record with 13 weeks.

Besting her chart performance in Billboard, Boone's "You Light Up My Life" single topped Record Worlds Top 100 Singles Chart for an unbroken record of 13 weeks. On Billboards chart, Boone was unseated from No. 1 by the Bee Gees, with "How Deep Is Your Love", the first of three No. 1 singles from the Saturday Night Fever soundtrack. On Record Worlds chart, Boone kept the Bee Gees out of the number-one spot. In Cash Box magazine, "You Light Up My Life" managed only an eight-week stay at the top of the chart, before being dethroned by Crystal Gayle's "Don't It Make My Brown Eyes Blue".  Its least-lengthy run was on the Radio and Records chart, with six weeks at No. 1 before relinquishing the spot to the Bee Gees; it had knocked Carly Simon's "Nobody Does It Better" out of the top spot after only one week.

The single, which was certified platinum by the Recording Industry Association of America (RIAA), also hit No. 1 on the Adult Contemporary chart and reached No. 4 on the Country chart. The single peaked at No. 48 on the UK Singles Chart. Boone's hit single led to her winning the 1978 Grammy Award for Best New Artist, with additional Grammy nominations for Best Pop Vocal Performance, Female and Record of the Year. Boone also won the 1977 American Music Award for Favorite Pop Single.

Decades after its release, the Debby Boone version is still considered one of the top ten Billboard Hot 100 songs of all time. In 2008, it was ranked at No. 7 on Billboards "Hot 100 All-Time Top Songs" list (August 1958 - July 2008). An updated version of the all-time list in 2013 ranked the song at No. 9.

Although it was written by Brooks as a love song, the devout Boone interpreted it as inspirational and proclaimed that it was instead God who "lit up her life." This fact was later alluded to when the song appeared in The Simpsons episode "I Married Marge", Season 3, Episode 12.

Track listing
7" vinyl single
"You Light Up My Life"* – 3:35
"Hasta Mañana"** – 3:12

* Note: Produced and arranged by Joe Brooks.** Note: Produced by Mike Curb and arranged by Al Capps.

Chart performance (Debby Boone single)

Weekly charts

Year-end charts

All-time charts

LeAnn Rimes version

LeAnn Rimes released her own version of "You Light Up My Life" as a single in 1997, 20 years after Boone's version was released, and on the same record label, the Warner Bros. Records label's Curb Records label. Her version fared modestly by comparison to the original at radio (No. 34 Pop, No. 48 Country).  However, her single was certified gold and was the title track to her No. 1 pop and country album, You Light Up My Life: Inspirational Songs.

Track listing
US CD single
 "You Light Up My Life"* – 3:37
 "I Believe"** – 2:22

* Note: Produced by Wilbur C. Rimes, Chuck Howard and Mike Curb.
** Note: Produced by Wilbur C. Rimes.

Chart performance (LeAnn Rimes single)

Other versions
Many artists have covered "You Light Up My Life" since 1977.
Perry Como performed it on Bob Hope's TV special in 1977 (then recorded for CD in 2000). 
Johnny Mathis recorded the song and named his 1978 album after the song. 
Engelbert Humperdinck also recorded "You Light Up My Life" in 1978, including it on his album "Last of the Romantics". The song has also been recorded by Aretha Franklin, Loleatta Holloway, Jean Carn, Kenny Rogers, Angeline Quinto, José Carreras, Robert Goulet, Carole King, and Samantha Cole. 
Valeria Lynch recorded the song covered "Tú me haces feliz" for her 1979 album Yo soy tu canción....
Japanese singer Yuki Saito recorded it (in English) for her 1994 album Moi.
Whitney Houston recorded the song for her 2002 album Just Whitney.... 
The Irish pop band Westlife recorded a cover of the song and made it to their The Love Album album in 2006 which went straight to No. 1 in UK Albums Chart and performed it live subsequently. 
A French rendering entitled "Tu remplis ma vie" was recorded by Anne Renée in 1977.
America's Got Talent season 1 winner Bianca Ryan covered the song for her 2006 debut album.
Patti Smith performed the song on the ABC television program Kids Are People Too, accompanied by Brooks on piano.

In other media
The song features as a running joke in an episode of Girlfriends, titled "Can't Stan Ya!"

See also
List of RPM number-one singles of 1977
List of Hot 100 number-one singles of 1977 (U.S.)
List of number-one adult contemporary singles of 1977 (U.S.)
List of Billboard Hot 100 chart achievements and milestones
List of 1970s one-hit wonders in the United States

References

External links

1977 songs
1977 debut singles
1997 singles
Debby Boone songs
LeAnn Rimes songs
Arista Records singles
Warner Records singles
Curb Records singles
Best Original Song Academy Award-winning songs
Best Original Song Golden Globe winning songs
Grammy Award for Song of the Year
Billboard Hot 100 number-one singles
Cashbox number-one singles
RPM Top Singles number-one singles
Love themes
1970s ballads
Pop ballads
2006 debut singles
Bianca Ryan songs
Songs written by Joseph Brooks (songwriter)
Westlife songs